Hiram is a town in Oxford County, Maine, United States.  The population was 1,609 at the 2020 census. It includes the villages of Hiram, East Hiram, South Hiram and Durgintown. Located among the rugged and unspoiled Western Maine Mountains, Hiram is part of the Portland-South Portland-Biddeford, Maine metropolitan New England city and town area.

History

It became a stage stop along the Pequawket Trail, the former wilderness path of the Sokokis Abenakis which runs from Standish to Fryeburg (site of Pequawket, their stockaded village). First known as Great Ossipee after the Ossipee River, the town was settled in the 1780s and organized as Hiram Plantation, named after Hiram I, the biblical king of Tyre. Like King Hiram's domain, Hiram Plantation was set among forests. It was incorporated as a district on February 27, 1807, then as the town of Hiram on June 14, 1814. Peleg Wadsworth bought a tract of land here in 1790, and in 1792 or 1794 began clearing a farm for his eldest son.

Although uneven at the center, there was good and fertile farmland in the intervales. The soil was sandy loam, yielding wheat and hay, the principal crop. Sheep grazed the pastures, and their wool became an important product. In 1830, the town's population was 1,148.

The Saco River and ponds serving as reservoirs for tributary streams supplied water power for mills, and manufacturing timber became an important industry. In 1859, town industries included a number of cooper shops, two blacksmiths, several shoemaking shops and a harness making shop. By 1886, the town had five sawmills and planing mills, producing short and long lumber, barrel staves and shooks. It also had two gristmills and a carding mill. Other products included men's clothing, harness and slate blackboards. Described as "a pretty village amid charming scenery," Hiram was a junction where the Bridgton and Saco River Railroad met the Portland and Ogdensburg Railroad, which first opened service through the White Mountains on August 16, 1875.

Geography
Hiram is drained by the Ossipee River and Saco River.

The town is crossed by state routes 5, 113, 117, and 160. It is bordered by the towns of Brownfield and Denmark to the north, Porter to the west, Sebago and Baldwin to the east, and Cornish and Parsonsfield to the south.

Climate
This climatic region is typified by large seasonal temperature differences, with warm to hot (and often humid) summers and cold (sometimes severely cold) winters.  According to the Köppen Climate Classification system, Hiram has a humid continental climate, abbreviated "Dfb" on climate maps.

Demographics

2010 census
As of the census of 2010, there were 1,620 people, 652 households, and 432 families living in the town. The racial makeup of the town was 95.7% White, 0.1% African American, 0.6% Native American, 0.4% Asian, 0.4% from other races, and 2.7% from two or more races. Hispanic or Latino of any race were 0.7% of the population.

There were 652 households, of which 31.4% had children under the age of 18 living with them, 50.6% were married couples living together, 11.0% had a female householder with no husband present, 4.6% had a male householder with no wife present, and 33.7% were non-families. 26.5% of all households were made up of individuals, and 8.9% had someone living alone who was 65 years of age or older. The average household size was 2.48 and the average family size was 3.00.

The median age in the town was 41.3 years. 25.1% of residents were under the age of 18; 7% were between the ages of 18 and 24; 23.2% were from 25 to 44; 30.9% were from 45 to 64; and 13.7% were 65 years of age or older. The gender makeup of the town was 51.4% male and 48.6% female.

2000 census
As of the census of 2000, there were 1,423 people, 534 households, and 388 families living in the town. There were 769 housing units at an average density of 20.5 per square mile (7.9/km2). The racial makeup of the town was 97.61% White, 0.07% African American, 0.49% Native American, 0.28% Asian, 0.07% from other races, and 1.48% from two or more races. Hispanic or Latino of any race were 0.42% of the population.

There were 534 households, out of which 36.3% had children under the age of 18 living with them, 60.1% were married couples living together, 8.6% had a female householder with no husband present, and 27.3% were non-families. 19.5% of all households were made up of individuals, and 7.3% had someone living alone who was 65 years of age or older.  The average household size was 2.66 and the average family size was 3.07.

In the town, the population was spread out, with 27.8% under the age of 18, 6.4% from 18 to 24, 29.4% from 25 to 44, 25.7% from 45 to 64, and 10.8% who were 65 years of age or older.  The median age was 37 years. For every 100 females, there were 99.3 males.  For every 100 females age 18 and over, there were 99.8 males.

The median income for a household in the town was $34,167, and the median income for a family was $36,964. Males had a median income of $27,784 versus $22,500 for females. The per capita income for the town was $16,293.  About 12.0% of families and 14.0% of the population were below the poverty line, including 18.8% of those under age 18 and 3.9% of those age 65 or over.

Local schools
 Sacopee Valley Middle School
 Sacopee Valley High School

Notable people 

 Contessa Brewer, MSNBC anchorwoman
 Charles Cleaves Cole, federal judge
 Henry Wadsworth Longfellow, poet
 Peleg Wadsworth, general, founded Hiram

References

External links
 Town of Hiram official website
 Soldiers Memorial Library
 Maine.gov – Hiram, Maine
 Maine Genealogy: Hiram, Oxford County, Maine

Towns in Oxford County, Maine
Towns in Maine